"I Belong to You (Every Time I See Your Face)" is a song co-written and performed by American contemporary R&B singer Rome. It is the opening track on his eponymous debut album and was issued as the album's first single. The song is Rome's biggest hit to date on the Billboard Hot 100, peaking at #6 in 1997.

The single was certified platinum by the RIAA on June 11, 1997 and sold 1.3 million copies.

Music video

The official music video for the song was directed by Chris Erskin.

Chart positions

Weekly charts

Year-end charts

References

External links
 
 

1996 songs
1997 debut singles
RCA Records singles
Rome (singer) songs
Music videos directed by Christopher Erskin
Songs written by Rome (singer)